is the ninth studio album by Japanese singer-songwriter Yumi Matsutoya, released in June 1980.

Pictures featured on the back and front sleeve art were taken at the Brown's Hotel in London. No songs were released as a single except "Tamerai", which first appeared as a B-side of the non-album track "Daydream", released in May 1980.

Like other studio albums which came out after she remained with EMI in 1977 when Alfa finally started operating as a record label, Toki no Nai Hotel was released on CD for the first time in 1985. The album was reissued in 1999, digitally remastered by Bernie Grundman.

Track listing
All songs written and composed by Yumi Matsutoya, arranged by Masataka Matsutoya.
""– 5:26
""  – 4:15
"Miss Lonely"  – 4:28
"Ame ni Kieta Jogger "  – 5:00
""  – 3:46
""  – 4:30
""  – 6:22
""  – 7:18
""  – 4:02

Footnotes

Recorded versions
"Mizu no Kage" was originally written for the female folk duo called Simons in 1978.
"Tamerai" was originally written for Midori Hagio. The song was later covered by Yoshiko Miyazaki, Keiko Saito, and Pink Lady member Keiko Masuda. 
Queen's Fellows, a 2002 tribute album for Matsutoya includes two cover versions of the songs which were featured on Toki no Nai Hotel; "Cecile no Shumatsu" performed by Aiko and the title track by Takao Tajima.

Personnel
Masataka Matsutoya - keyboards
Tatsuo Hayashi - drums
Jun Aoyama - drums
Yuichi Tokashiki - drums
Nobu Saito - percussion
Kenji Takamizu - bass guitar
Tsugutoshi Goto - bass guitar
Masaki Matsubara - electric guitar
Shigeru Suzuki - electric guitar
Tsuyoshi Kon - electric guitar
Chuei Yoshikawa - acoustic guitar, mandolin
Hiromi Yasuda - acoustic guitar
Masamichi Sugi - backing vocals
Kiyoshi Saito  - saxophone
Jake H Conception - saxophone
Shunzo Sunabara - saxophone
Yukio Eto - flute
Eiju Yamada - horn
Yasuhiro Okita- horn
Tomato Strings Unsemble - strings
Junichi Hiiro - violin
Leona - backing vocals
Clara - backing vocals
Lilika - backing vocals
Hideki Matsutake - synthesizer programming

Chart position

References

1980 albums
Yumi Matsutoya albums
EMI Music Japan albums